Barcinosuchus (meaning "Cerro Barcino Formation's crocodile") is an extinct genus of carnivorous metasuchian from the early Cretaceous period. It is a peirosaurid which lived during the early Cretaceous period (Aptian to Albian stage) in what is now Chubut Province, Argentina. It is known from the holotype MPEF-PV 3095, which consists of skull, mandible, and postcranial remains. The specimen recovered from the lower part of the Cerro Castaño Member of the Cerro Barcino Formation. Barcinosuchus was named by Martín Leardi and Diego Pol in 2009 and the type species is Barcinosuchus gradilis.

References 

Terrestrial crocodylomorphs
Albian life
Aptian life
Early Cretaceous crocodylomorphs of South America
Cretaceous Argentina
Fossils of Argentina
 
Fossil taxa described in 2009
Prehistoric pseudosuchian genera